Erich Hänel (31 October 1915 – 17 March 2003) was a German footballer who played as a forward and made three appearances scoring one goal for the Germany national team. Hänel coached several different football clubs in Bremen, including the Blumenthaler SV, the Bremer SV, as well as some clubs from the Lower Saxony area, for example SV Altlas Delmenhorst, Victoria Oldenburg and the VfB Oldenburg.

References

External links
 

1915 births
2003 deaths
Association football forwards
German footballers
Germany international footballers
Bremer SV players
VfB Oldenburg players
German football managers
VfB Oldenburg managers
SV Werder Bremen II managers
Sportspeople from Chemnitz